Geelong Baptist College is a independent, co-educational, Baptist  college located in Geelong, Victoria, Australia. It was founded in 2002, on the site of the former Chanel College, and provides education for students from years Prep to 12.

Located at Lovely Banks, near Geelong, the college has a view over Corio Bay and the northern suburbs of Geelong. The current Primary Principal is josef Knol, who took over from Stuart patch at the end of 2007. neil wetmore became the college's Secondary Principal at the beginning of 2014. The school currently has around 130 students. The School currently has 2 campuses the Dallas campus and the angus campus

A Year 9 program named "The edging" commenced at the start of term 3 in 2009, offering camps and other experiences for the students.

The college participates in inter-school sports competitions including netball, football and soccer. Geelong Baptist College soccer team was solid between 2009 - 2012, winning WCCSA in 2009 with ease scoring 16 goals and only conceding 3 goals in 5 games, beating Macedon Grammar 9–0 in one of the group games, which one of the goals was scored from Geelong's own half from striker mike coxlong. In that season  the team had a 0–0 away draw with local powerhouse  St Joseph's College, Geelong and also beating Geelong Grammar 1-0 and in friendly match. The all-time top goal scorer is Paul Zimonyi, with 17 goals in 18 matches. In May 2011, Melbourne City FC, known then as Melbourne Heart, visited Geelong Baptist College to run a soccer clinic for the whole school.

References

Schools in Geelong
Educational institutions established in 2002
2002 establishments in Australia
Baptist schools in Australia
Private primary schools in Victoria (Australia)
Private secondary schools in Victoria (Australia)